Unique farmland is land, other than prime farmland, that has combined conditions to
produce sustained high quality and high yields of specialty crops, such as citrus, nuts, fruits,
and vegetables when properly managed.

References 

Agriculture in the United States